The Andreotti I Cabinet was the 27th cabinet of the Italian Republic.

With a total of 152 votes in favor and 158 against, the government did not gain the confidence of the Senate and was forced to resign after only 9 days. So far, this government has been the one with the shortest period of full powers in the history of the Italian Republic, and the third one to be refused by the vote of confidence by the parliament, which caused the first early elections of the Republic.

Composition

|}

References

1972 establishments in Italy

Italian governments
1972 disestablishments in Italy
Cabinets established in 1972
Cabinets disestablished in 1972
Andreotti 1 Cabinet